= Weightlifting at the 2010 South American Games – Men's 94kg =

The Men's 94 kg event at the 2010 South American Games was held over March 29 at 14:00.

== Medalists ==
Gold	Silver	Bronze
Wilmer Torres; Colombia	Leomar Albarran; Venezuela	Jose Barros; Argentina

== Results ==
Rank	Athlete	Bodyweight	Snatch			Clean & Jerk			Total
Rank	Athlete	Bodyweight	1	2	3	1	2	3	Total
1st place, gold medalist(s)	Wilmer Torres (COL)	91.11	155	160	~~170~~	190	196	200	360
2nd place, silver medalist(s)	Leomar Albarran (VEN)	93.63	~~150~~	150	~~157~~	187	196	~~200~~	346
3rd place, bronze medalist(s)	Jose Barros (ARG)	93.75	134	139	~~141~~	165	170	172	311
4	Juan Ignacio Ascencio (CHI)	92.79	135	~~140~~	141	160	167	~~171~~	308
5	Rafael Andrade (BRA)	93.71	135	~~140~~	~~140~~	~~170~~	~~170~~	171	306
6	Javier Alejandro Opazo (CHI)	88.38	125	~~132~~	~~132~~	160	167	~~172~~	292
